Skyblazer is a platform video game published by Sony Imagesoft, released in early 1994 for the Super Nintendo Entertainment System. It involves Sky, the Skyblazer hero (Garuda in the Japanese version) searching for Ashura, the Lord of War, who had kidnapped the sorceress Ariana (Vishnu in the Japanese version).

Gameplay 

There are a total of 17 levels with a few more stops on the map where the elder (Brahma in the Japanese version) gives passwords to the player and ten bosses including the final boss, Raglan (Ravana in the Japanese version). Four of those must be fought twice, since they reappear immediately before Ashura, who appears before Raglan. An overhead map allows for movement between levels, including back to ones already completed, and its slight non-linearity allows the player to skip some levels (at the cost of the magic spells and other powerups obtainable in them).

Most of the levels are side-scrolling, but there are some levels involving flight, either automatically scrolling or in Mode 7, where the player can grab crystals towards extra lives but will exit the level upon touching a spike and falling. Also, some levels expand on the usual platform structure by including waterways whose paths can be varied with switches, and there are areas with rotating towers. Two of the bosses also use extensive Mode 7, expanding and rotating around the screen or coming in the form of rotating walls.

There are eight secondary attacks available beyond the basic punch and kick, but unlike those they require magic power. Magic powerups, signified by flasks of red liquid in either small or large sizes, can replenish the power needed to use these while flasks of green fluid restore health. There are gems of both small and large sizes; a large gem counts the same as 10 small ones, and obtaining 100 gems will give a player an extra life. There are also outright 1-ups.

Development and release 

Blood from the Japanese release was re-colored green for the Western releases.

Reception 

GamePro lauded Skyblazer as "a great mix of side-scrolling action, puzzle solving, special powers, and tactics." They praised the high challenge, mythological setting, simple controls, and "inventive uses of Mode 7." Electronic Gaming Monthly scored the game a 7.8 out of 10, with reviewer Mike Weigand praising the challenge, graphics, and control. French magazine Joypad gave it 93%.

Notes

References

External links 
 Skyblazer at GameFAQs
 Skyblazer at Giant Bomb
 Skyblazer at MobyGames

1994 video games
Epic/Sony Records games
Side-scrolling platform games
Single-player video games
Super Nintendo Entertainment System games
Super Nintendo Entertainment System-only games
Ukiyotei games
Video games based on Hindu mythology
Video games developed in Japan
Video games scored by Harumi Fujita